This is a list of Statutory Instruments made in the United Kingdom in the year 2023.

1-100

101-200

201-300

301-400

See also

Notes

References

External links

Law of the United Kingdom
Lists of Statutory Instruments of the United Kingdom